The 2022–23 Longwood Lancers men's basketball team represents Longwood University in the 2022–23 NCAA Division I men's basketball season. The Lancers, led by fifth-year head coach Griff Aldrich, play their home games at Willett Hall in Farmville, Virginia as members of the Big South Conference.

Previous season
The Lancers finished the 2021–22 season 26–6, 15–1 in Big South play to win the Big South regular season championship. They defeated North Carolina A&T, USC Upstate, and Winthrop to win the Big South tournament championship. As a result, the Lancers received the conference's automatic bid to the NCAA tournament, the school's first-ever trip to the tournament, where they received the No. 14 seed in the South Region, where they would lose in the first round to Tennessee.

Roster

Schedule and results

|-
!colspan=12 style=| Non-conference regular season

|-
!colspan=12 style=| Big South regular season

|-
!colspan=12 style=| Big South tournament
|-

|-

Sources

References

Longwood Lancers men's basketball seasons
Longwood Lancers
Longwood Lancers men's basketball
Longwood Lancers men's basketball